Tony Zierra is an American director and producer. He is best known for the documentaries: My Big Break (2009), in which he also appeared, and Filmworker (2017).

From an early age Zierra's goal was to become a filmmaker. He attended film studies classes at NYU, Texas A&M and UCLA. His first documentary, Carving Out Our Name, premiered at the Toronto International Film Festival to much acclaim.
 Shortly after, Zierra went on the road to capture America’s reaction to the September 11 attacks. The film that emerged,USA The Movie, explores the cyclical nature of violence and retaliation. The film was the subject of an in-depth analysis from a Deleuzian perspective by scholar and commentator Dion Dennis.

Zierra's award-winning documentary, My Big Break, is a cautionary tale about the darker side of celebrity and the consequences of fame that also includes his struggle to make his first film. My Big Break has received consistently strong reviews and has been repeatedly praised for its unusually candid look at the effects of success on young rising stars in Hollywood.

My Big Break won Best Documentary at the Boston Film Festival, Best Documentary at Artsfest, Pennsylvania, was nominated for Best Documentary at the Raindance Film Festival in London and was an official selection of The American Cinematic Experience Festival in New York. Zierra has been a featured speaker at The Popular Culture American Culture (PCA/ACA) national academic conference in New Orleans, PCA/ACA Southwest/Texas academic conference and the PCA/ACA national academic conference in Boston.

Zierra's latest production is the documentary SK13 about the legendary filmmaker, Stanley Kubrick. The film deals specifically with the Kubrick film Eyes Wide Shut, this being Kubrick's 13th feature film.
His documentary ''Filmworker"
 about the life of Stanley Kubrick's longtime assistant, Leon Vitali was part of the Cannes Film Festival Official Selection 2017 premiering in Cannes Classics

References

External links 

 
Final Film Courage

American male actors
Tisch School of the Arts alumni
Texas A&M University alumni
UCLA Film School alumni
Living people
Year of birth missing (living people)